Nietoperek  is a village in the administrative district of Gmina Międzyrzecz, within Międzyrzecz County, Lubusz Voivodeship, in western Poland.

The village has a population of 239 (population in 2008).

Sports
 KS Inter Nietoperek – men's football club (Polish league level 8)

See also
Regenwurmlager

References

Nietoperek